América Futebol Clube, commonly known as América Alagoano or América-AL, was a Brazilian football club based in São Luís do Quitunde, Alagoas. The team last participated in the Campeonato Alagoano Segunda Divisão in the 2005 season.

History
The club was founded on 8 June 1952.

Stadium
América Futebol Clube play their home games at Estádio Municipal Eduardo de Melo Gonçalves, nicknamed Eduardão. The stadium has a maximum capacity of 1,000 people.

References

Association football clubs established in 1952
Defunct football clubs in Alagoas
1952 establishments in Brazil